is a 1983 LCD game developed and published by Nintendo under their Game & Watch series. It follows earlier Mario games, like the arcade and Game & Watch versions of Donkey Kong. Players control Mario as he navigates elevators and funnels cement through a factory, while trying to prevent the cement from crushing his fellow workers. Two versions of the game were released — a Table Top unit and a handheld game akin to most other Game & Watch titles. Development was headed by Nintendo R&D1, led by engineer Gunpei Yokoi.

The game has been re-released several times; it was featured as part of Game Boy Gallery for the Game Boy, Game & Watch Gallery 4 for the Game Boy Advance, and as a digital download for the Nintendo DSi. It has been described by critics as one of the strangest games in the Mario franchise.

Gameplay
Mario's Cement Factory puts players in control of Mario, who works at a cement factory where he funnels cement into cement trucks. Mario must navigate two dangerous elevators and avoid falling or being crushed and losing a life. He must also continually empty cement into the trucks, or else the cement will overflow and crush one of the workers below, which costs players a life. There are two game modes: A and B, the latter being faster paced and more difficult.

Development
Mario's Cement Factory was developed by Nintendo R&D1, which at the time was led by Gunpei Yokoi, and published by Nintendo. Like all Game & Watch releases, each unit is a standalone portable device that doubles as a clock and can only play the one game. Hirokazu Tanaka composed the game sounds.

Two versions of the game were released. The first is part of the Game & Watch Table Top series and debuted on April 28, 1983. It has a full color illuminated screen, and approximately 250,000 models were produced. The Table Top series did not sell as well, leading to Mario's Cement Factory being one of only four Table Top units ever produced. A smaller handheld version was later released on June 8 as part of the New Wide Screen series. It has a monochrome screen with a color overlay, and approximately 750,000 units were produced.

The game was released the same year that Nintendo's Famicom system debuted in Japan, and two years after the first Mario title (the arcade game Donkey Kong).

The first revision of the tabletop version is notable for playing a brief excerpt of the Queen song Another One Bites The Dust whenever a new game is started. In later revisions of the game, this excerpt was replaced with a generic melody.

Re-releases

Mario's Cement Factory has been re-released in various forms. It was included in the 1995 Game Boy Gallery for Game Boy, featuring updated graphics. It was also re-released in the Nintendo Mini Classics line, which repackaged Game & Watch games in small Game Boy-like devices. Both the New Wide Screen and an updated version were included in the 2002 Game & Watch Gallery 4 for the Game Boy Advance. In 2009, the game was re-released for the Nintendo DSi's DSiWare download service (along with other Game & Watch games). The DSi version was released in Japan on August 18. It was released in North America and Europe in March 2010. The DSi version was also given as a reward on Nintendo's now-defunct Club Nintendo service.

Reception

Mario's Cement Factory has been called one of the best Game & Watch games, and praised for its relative complexity. One critic called it fun, another an "old favorite", while another praised its replay value. Staff for the magazine Video Games regarded it as a more difficult game than many before it. Yet, it received some criticism; it has been called primitive by the standards of today, and one review of the DSiWare release complained that the controls were too "picky and precise".

It has been called one of the stranger entries in the Mario series. Mario's role as a cement factory worker has been mentioned in multiple articles that cover the array of professions Mario has undertaken.

The original units have become collector's items and, like many Game & Watch titles, a complete-in-box unit can sell for over US$100. The game was featured in a Gunpei Yokoi exhibit in Harajuku in 2010.

Notes

References

DSiWare games
Game & Watch games
1983 video games
Video games developed in Japan
Handheld electronic games
Cement Factory